Silvia León (born 22 February 1958) is a Peruvian former volleyball player who competed in the 1980 Summer Olympics. She was a member of the silver medal-winning Peruvian team at the 1979 Pan American Games. She was a member of the Peruvian team that won second place in the World Championship in 1982.

References

1958 births
Living people
Peruvian women's volleyball players
Olympic volleyball players of Peru
Volleyball players at the 1980 Summer Olympics
Pan American Games silver medalists for Peru
Volleyball players at the 1979 Pan American Games
Pan American Games medalists in volleyball
Medalists at the 1979 Pan American Games
20th-century Peruvian women